LongGone is a studio album by Joshua Redman's quartet, consisting of himself on saxophone, Brad Mehldau on piano, Christian McBride on bass, and Brian Blade on drums. This is the quartet's third release after MoodSwing in 1994 and RoundAgain in 2020. The album features six tracks written by Redman: five originals and one ("Rejoice") taken from MoodSwing.

The album was nominated as Best Jazz Instrumental Album at 65th Annual Grammy Awards.

Reception
At Metacritic, that assigns a normalized rating out of 100 to reviews from mainstream critics, the album received an average score of 88, based on four reviews, which indicates "universal acclaim".

Jeff Tamarkin writing for JazzTimes stated, "Redman’s dominance aside, LongGone ultimately isn’t about the dexterity of the individual. Like its predecessors, it’s a textbook display of what happens when a group of musicians—each a leader in his own right—understand and trust one another enough to let the music go where it must." John Fordham of The Guardian commented, "The quartet’s mid-90s rapport was enthralling, but burgeoning solo careers separated them until 2020’s RoundAgain reunion showed that their individual experiences since had only sharpened their intuition as a foursome. Now 2022’s LongGone takes the story forward." Matt Collar of AllMusic added, " Most of LongGone feels deeply organic, with Redman and his bandmates feeding off each other and working to build something cohesive and bigger than their individual contributions."

Track listing

Personnel 
Band
 Joshua Redman – tenor saxophone, soprano saxophone
 Brad Mehldau – piano
 Christian McBride – bass
 Brian Blade – drums

Production
 Greg Calbi – mastering
 James Farber – associate producer, engineer, mixing
 Brian Montgomery – engineer
 Owen Mulholland – assistant engineer
 Steven Sacco – assistant engineer

Charts

References

External links 

Joshua Redman albums
2022 albums
Nonesuch Records albums